Gerard Beirne is an Irish author and literary editor. He is a fiction editor for The Fiddlehead and curates the online magazine The Irish Literary Times. 

In 2008, Beirne served as Writer in Residence at the University of New Brunswick, where he taught creative writing. Beirne currently teaches at the Atlantic Technological University in Sligo.

Awards and Honours 
In 1996, Beirne was awarded two Hennessey Literary Awards, "New Irish Writer of the Year" and "Best Emerging Fiction Writer". His debut novel The Eskimo in the Net was short-listed for the 2004 Kerry Group Irish Fiction Award and was selected as Book of the Year by the Daily Express. In 1997, Digging My Own Grave was runner-up for the Patrick Kavanagh Poetry Award. 
In 2000, Bono starred in a short film adaptation of Beirne's story "Sightings of Bono." Beirne's collaboration with composer Siobhán Cleary, Hum, was called "a theatrical tour de force" by The Irish Times. Beirne's first short story collection, In a Time of Drought and Hunger was shortlisted for the 2016 Danuta Gleed Literary Award. That same year, he was shortlisted for the Bord Gáis Energy Irish Book Awards for his short story "What a River Remembers of its Course."

Selected works

Novels 
 The Eskimo in the Net. London: Marion Boyars, 2003.
 Turtle. Ottawa: Oberon, 2009.
 Charlie Tallulah. Ottawa: Oberon, 2013.

Short Story Collections 

 In a Time of Drought and Hunger. Ottawa: Oberon, 2015.

Poetry 
 Digging My Own Grave. Dublin: Dedalus, 1997.
 Games of Chance: A Gambler's Manual. Ottawa: Oberon, 2011.

Theatre and Film 

 Hum! with Siobhán Cleary. Commissioned by Irish Chamber Orchestra 1998. Revived by the RTÉ National Symphony Orchestra in 2020.
 Sightings of Bono. Parallel Productions, 2000. Starring Bono.

References

External links 
Gerard Beirne.com — official website.

Living people
20th-century Irish novelists
20th-century Irish male writers
Irish male novelists
20th-century Irish poets
Academic staff of the University of New Brunswick
Place of birth missing (living people)
1962 births
Irish male poets
21st-century Irish novelists
20th-century Canadian novelists
21st-century Canadian novelists
21st-century Irish poets
20th-century Canadian poets
20th-century Canadian male writers
21st-century Canadian poets
Canadian male poets
Canadian male novelists
Canadian male short story writers
21st-century Canadian short story writers
Irish male short story writers
21st-century Irish short story writers
Irish emigrants to Canada
20th-century Canadian short story writers
21st-century Canadian male writers